Japanese football in 2011

J.League Division 1

J.League Division 2

Japan Football League

Japanese Regional Leagues

Emperor's Cup

J.League Cup

Japanese Super Cup

Suruga Bank Championship

FIFA Club World Cup

National team (Men)

Results

Players statistics

Goal scorers

National team (Women)

Results

Players statistics

Notes

References

 
Seasons in Japanese football